Chavigny may refer:

 Chavigny, Aisne, a commune in the department of Aisne, France
 Chavigny, Meurthe-et-Moselle, a commune in the department of Meurthe-et-Moselle, France
 Chavigny-Bailleul, a commune in the department of Eure, France
 Jean-Aimé de Chavigny